Shamar Irvin Stephen (born February 25, 1991) is an American football defensive end who is currently a free agent. He played college football at UConn. He was drafted by the Minnesota Vikings in the seventh round, 220th overall, of the 2014 NFL Draft. He has also played for the Seattle Seahawks.

Early years
Stephen attended Long Island Lutheran Middle and High School in Brookville, New York, where he was a two-sport standout playing football and basketball. As a sophomore, he played both on defense and offense and compiled 9 tackles and a sack while also rushing for 91 yards on 18 carries (5.1 avg.) and a touchdown. As a junior, he started every game at defensive tackle and recorded 41 tackles and 7 sacks. While serving as the team captain in his senior season, he earned All-American Lutheran Team honors after finishing his final prep year with 57 tackles and 12.0 sacks along with 2 blocked kicks, helping lead the Crusaders to a 7-2 record. In basketball, he was teammates with current Philadelphia 76ers player Tobias Harris as a sophomore.

College career
Stephen played college football at Connecticut from 2009 to 2013, where he was named a team captain prior to his senior season and also winning team MVP following the season. He was selected to the All-American Athletic Conference Second Team also in his senior season. Stephen was selected and participated in the 2014 Senior Bowl following the season at Connecticut.

Professional career

Minnesota Vikings
Stephen was drafted by the Minnesota Vikings in the seventh round (220th overall pick) of the 2014 NFL Draft, becoming the first player from the University of Connecticut drafted by the team since running back Vince Clements in 1971.

2014 season
Stephen enjoyed a solid rookie season, with only first-round linebacker Anthony Barr being more productive among Vikings' rookie defenders. In the preseason, he received first-team snaps at nose tackle and lined up in both the nose and three-technique spots. He played 42 snaps against the Arizona Cardinals in Week 2, getting the second-most playing time of any Vikings defender. Stephen played in all 16 regular season games, the only Vikings rookie to do so, and started three times. He made his professional debut in the Vikings' season opener against the St. Louis Rams on September 7, 2014, notching two total tackles. He started his second career game against the Panthers in Week 13 and notched a career-best 10 tackles, with five solo stops. In the loss at Miami in Week 16, he had a season-high four quarterback hurries. On November 23, he made his first career start against the Green Bay Packers, replacing Sharrif Floyd at defensive tackle and matching his then career-best with four tackles in the game.

2015 season
In his second season, Stephen played in the first five games of the season for the Vikings. In Week 2, he recovered his first career fumble against the Detroit Lions after he fell on a Theo Riddick fumble forced by safety Harrison Smith. The following week, he had season-highs in defensive snaps with 20 and tackles with two against the San Diego Chargers.

On October 18, 2015, Stephen suffered a season-ending toe injury against the Kansas City Chiefs in Week 6 and was carted off the field. The Vikings would go on to place him on injured reserve on October 20, 2015.

2016–2017 seasons
In 2016, Stephen started all 16 games, recording a career-high 39 tackles.

In 2017, Stephen was moved to a reserve role, starting only one game in 15 games played, recording 28 tackles.

Seattle Seahawks

On March 24, 2018, Stephen signed with the Seattle Seahawks.

Return to Minnesota
On March 13, 2019, Stephen returned to the Vikings, signing a three-year, $12.45 million contract.
In week 4 against the Chicago Bears, Stephen recorded his first sack of his second tenure with the Vikings on Chase Daniel in the 16-6 loss.

Stephen was released on March 16, 2021.

Denver Broncos
Stephen signed a one-year contract with the Denver Broncos on April 8, 2021.

NFL statistics

References

External links
Connecticut bio 
Minnesota Vikings bio

Living people
1991 births
African-American players of American football
American football defensive tackles
UConn Huskies football players
Denver Broncos players
Minnesota Vikings players
People from Brookville, New York
People from Westbury, New York
Players of American football from New York (state)
Seattle Seahawks players
Sportspeople from Nassau County, New York
21st-century African-American sportspeople